Tomasz Rossa (born 5 April 1967) is a Polish diver. He competed in the men's 3 metre springboard event at the 1988 Summer Olympics.

References

1967 births
Living people
Polish male divers
Olympic divers of Poland
Divers at the 1988 Summer Olympics
Divers from Warsaw